Yshmael "Mang" Ismail Sali is a Filipino politician from the province of Tawi-Tawi, Philippines. He currently serves as Governor of the province. He was first elected as Governor in 2019.

References

External links
Province of Tawi-Tawi

Living people
National Unity Party (Philippines) politicians
People from Tawi-Tawi
Year of birth missing (living people)
Filipino Muslims